Siniša Radanović (Serbian Cyrillic: Синиша Радановић; born 23 November 1979) is a Serbian former professional footballer who played as a defender.

After starting out at Vrbas, Radanović represented Mladost Apatin, Hajduk Kula (three spells), and Borac Čačak in his homeland. He also played for Vitória Guimarães, Shandong Luneng, and Kecskemét in the top leagues of Portugal, China, and Hungary, respectively.

References

External links
 HLSZ profile
 
 

Association football defenders
Chinese Super League players
Expatriate footballers in China
Expatriate footballers in Hungary
Expatriate footballers in Portugal
First League of Serbia and Montenegro players
FK Borac Čačak players
FK Hajduk Kula players
FK Mladost Apatin players
FK Vrbas players
Kecskeméti TE players
Nemzeti Bajnokság I players
Primeira Liga players
Serbian expatriate footballers
Serbian expatriate sportspeople in China
Serbian expatriate sportspeople in Hungary
Serbian expatriate sportspeople in Portugal
Serbian First League players
Serbian footballers
Serbian SuperLiga players
Shandong Taishan F.C. players
Sportspeople from Subotica
Vitória S.C. players
1979 births
Living people